Hou Xianglin (April 4, 1912 – December 8, 2008) was a Chinese chemist. He was a member of the Chinese Academy of Sciences.

References 

1912 births
2008 deaths
Members of the Chinese Academy of Sciences